Edenbridge was a Jewish farming settlement northeast of Melfort, Saskatchewan. Its first residents came from Lithuania via South Africa. The name is an Anglicization of Yid'n Bridge (Jews' Bridge), for a nearby bridge over the Carrot River.

At its peak the Edenbridge Hebrew Colony had about 170 inhabitants, a post office, a school, and a synagogue; Beth Israel Synagogue. The settlement is now abandoned.

See also
 Block settlement§Jewish
 History of the Jews in Canada
 Jewish Colonies in Canada

References

External links

 Frank Moore, Saskatchewan Ghost Towns
 Abraham Arnold, The Contribution of the Jews to the Opening and Development of the West

Jews and Judaism in Saskatchewan
Ghost towns in Saskatchewan
Historic Jewish communities in Canada
Willow Creek No. 458, Saskatchewan